Hygrocybe kula is a mushroom of the waxcap genus Hygrocybe found only in Royal National Park and Lane Cove Bushland Park. It was described in 1997 by mycologist Cheryl Grgurinovic.

See also
List of Hygrocybe species

References

External links

Fungi described in 1997
Fungi of Australia
kula
Taxa named by Cheryl A. Grgurinovic